Brazendale is a surname. Notable people with the surname include:

Cheryl Brazendale (born 1963), English swimmer
Richard Brazendale (born 1960), New Zealand cricketer